Greek National Road 9 (abbreviated as EO9) is a single carriageway with at-grade intersections in the West Greece and Peloponnese regions. It runs along the west coast of the Peloponnese peninsula, from Patras to Methoni via Pyrgos.

The government of Greece plans to replace the road by a new motorway. This will be a southern extension of the Ionia Odos, numbered A5, which will connect the Albanian border near Ioannina with the A7 north of Kalamata. It is expected to be completed in 2015.

Route

The National Road 9 passes through or along the following towns:

Patras (centre)
Paralia
Vrachnaiika
Alissos
Kato Achaia
Kareika
Lappas
Varda
Lechaina
Andravida
Kavasila
Gastouni
Savalia
Chanakia
Pyrgos
Epitalio
Kallikomo
Zacharo
Giannitsochori
Kalo Nero
Kyparissia
Filiatra
Gargalianoi
Pylos
Methoni

References

Further information

9
Roads in Western Greece
Roads in Peloponnese (region)